The WAGR U class was a single member class of 0-6-0T tank locomotive operated by the Western Australian Government Railways (WAGR) from 1904 until 1940.

History
The U class locomotive was built in 1903 by Vulcan Foundry, and was equipped initially with a crane jib with a three-ton capacity. It entered service early the following year, as a shunter and mobile crane numbered U7 at the then new Midland Railway Workshops.

In 1925, the locomotive was rebuilt and re-issued to traffic with the crane removed and the fuel and water capacity increased. It remained in service until 1940, when it was withdrawn and scrapped.

Namesake
The U class designation was reused in 1946 when the U class entered service.

See also

History of rail transport in Western Australia
List of Western Australian locomotive classes

References

Notes

Cited works

External links

Railway locomotives introduced in 1904
U WAGR class (1903)
Vulcan Foundry locomotives
0-6-0T locomotives
3 ft 6 in gauge locomotives of Australia
Shunting locomotives